Grobya is a genus of flowering plants from the orchid family, Orchidaceae. It contains 5 known species, all endemic to Brazil.

Grobya amherstiae Lindl.
Grobya cipoensis F.Barros & Lourenço
Grobya fascifera Rchb.f.
Grobya galeata Lindl.
Grobya guieselii F.Barros & Lourenço

See also
 List of Orchidaceae genera

References

  (1740)  Edwards's Botanical Register 20: pl.
  2005. Handbuch der Orchideen-Namen. Dictionary of Orchid Names. Dizionario dei nomi delle orchidee. Ulmer, Stuttgart
  (Eds)  (2009) Genera Orchidacearum Volume 5: Epidendroideae (Part 2): Epidendroideae, 32 ff. Oxford: Oxford University Press.

External links

Orchids of Brazil
Catasetinae genera
Catasetinae